Jackson Corpuz (born February 8, 1989) is a Filipino professional basketball player for the Magnolia Hotshots of the Philippine Basketball Association (PBA). He was undrafted during the 2014 PBA draft and was later signed by the Mahindra Floodbuster in 2017. He is known as the "Pinoy Fukuda" and is also known for repeatedly dyeing his hair multiple colors.

Professional career

PBA D-League 
After going undrafted in 2014, Corpuz played for the Erase XFoliant Erasers, the Derulo Accelero Oilers, and the  Bread Story Smashing Bakers in the PBA D-League. In the quarterfinals of the 2014-15 Aspirants' Cup, he and Jiovanni Jalalon each scored 21 points to force a rubber match for a slot in the semis. But they lost that match to the Café France-CEU Bakers. In the 2015 Foundation Cup, he switched to the Cebuana Lhuillier Gems. Against the MP Hotel Warriors, he scored 26 points in a 118–78 blowout win. 

Beginning in the 2016 Aspirants' Cup, he played for the Caida Tile Masters. His team made it to the semifinals that conference and in the Foundation Cup. They made it to the Finals of the 2017 Aspirants' Cup against the Cignal-San Beda Hawkeyes. The Tile Masters lost Game 1, but he bounced back in Game 2 with a double-double of 20 points and 11 rebounds. In Game 3, Hawkeye forward Jason Perkins had 21 points, including a go-ahead three pointer, that gave Cignal the Aspirants' Cup championship.

Mahindra Floodbuster / Kia Picanto / Columbian Dyip 
After averaging 20 points and 9.3 rebounds in the PBA D-League Finals, Corpuz was signed by the Mahindra Floodbuster. On April 10, 2017, he started in his debut, but was fined P5,000 after his debut. 

In the 2018 Philippine Cup, Corpuz injured his hand, putting him out for some time. He was injured again, this time an ankle injury after having 12 points and 7 rebounds in a loss to the San Miguel Beermen. In the 2018 Governors' Cup, he had solid performances. In a loss to the Beermen, he had a career-high 28 points and 10 rebounds. He had 19 points and five rebounds in a loss to the Alaska Aces. At the end of that season, he received a three-year contract. 

In the 2019 Philippine Cup, Corpuz had 21 points and 11 rebounds in a upset win over the Beermen. In their rematch in the Commissioner's Cup, he suffered an ACL sprain and a meniscus tear. He returned in the Governors' Cup in a win over the Northport Batang Pier.

Magnolia Hotshots 
After their season ended, the Magnolia Hotshots and the Dyip worked out a trade that sent Corpuz to Magnolia, and Aldrech Ramos to Columbian. Before the 2020 Philippine Cup was suspended, he had 16 points and 13 rebounds in his debut. Following the suspension, he had 20 points on 8-of-12 shooting and 11 rebounds against Barangay Ginebra. This started a six-game winning streak that ended when they were eliminated by the Phoenix Super LPG Fuel Masters.

In the 2021 Philippine Cup, Corpuz finished the elimination round leading the league with a career-high 6.6 rebounds per game. During Game 3 of the Finals, against the TnT Tropang Giga, he had an infamous tackle on Troy Rosario while Rosario was still in the air. As a result, Rosario had a bad fall and dislocated his finger and was also revealed to have suffered spinal shock, while Corpuz was ejected from the game. He then had to pay a P20,000 fine. The Hotshots lost that series, and both he and Rosario have made peace.

Corpuz signed a two-year deal with the Hotshots. He led the league in field goal percentage in the 2021 Governors' Cup, shooting 62.5% for that conference.

PBA career statistics

As of the end of 2021 season

Season-by-season averages
 
|-
| align=left | 
| align=left | Mahindra / Kia
| 17 || 17.6 || .440 || .000 || .688 || 5.8 || .6 || .3 || .5 || 6.3
|-
| align=left | 
| align=left | Kia / Columbian
| 28 || 16.9 || .509 || .000 || .633 || 4.8 || .8 || 1.0 || .8 || 7.6
|-
| align=left | 
| align=left | Columbian
| 28 || 23.3 || .477 || .327 || .597 || 5.9 || 1.0 || 1.1 || .7 || 10.0
|-
| align=left | 
| align=left | Magnolia
| 12 || 24.4 || .474 || .333 || .750 || 6.6 || .9 || .3 || .3 || 7.6
|-
| align=left | 
| align=left | Magnolia
| 40 || 12.1 || .469 || .333 || .638 || 2.9 || .4 || .3 || .3 || 4.0
|-class=sortbottom
| align=center colspan=2 | Career
| 125 || 17.6 || .477 || .306 || .641 || 4.7 || .7 || .6 || .5 || 6.8

References

1989 births
Living people
Basketball players from Isabela (province)
Terrafirma Dyip players
Ilocano people
Power forwards (basketball)
Magnolia Hotshots players
PCU Dolphins basketball players